George Athor Deng (1962 – 19 December 2011) was the Sudan People's Liberation Army lieutenant general and a SPLA dissident who led the South Sudan Democratic Movement and its military wing, the South Sudan Defence Army. He was also an independent candidate for the leadership of Jonglei prior to the independence of South Sudan.

Athor joined the SPLA in 1983 and was appointed to the rank of major general after the SPLA formalised their rank structures after 2005. Athor became Upper Nile (1st Division) then Jonglei division commander (Jonglei being 8th Division). He was later promoted to lieutenant general and made deputy chief of staff for political and moral orientation. Numerous rumors are accusing him to be involved into weapons smuggling, traffic of influence and misappropriation of funds both in Jonglei and Upper Nile. He was also deeply involved in the White Army bloody disarmament in 2006. After the April 2010 elections, after suspicions of fraud in the process, Athor orchestrated a series of attacks on SPLA bases. Further attacks lead to great insecurity in the north-western portion of Jonglei state. Although Athor reportedly agreed to a ceasefire before the January 2011 referendum, in February 2011, BBC reported the killing of 200 civilians by Athor's men.

On 20 December 2011, it was reported by the BBC that Athor had been killed trying to enter South Sudan in an attempt to gain more troops. South Sudan's Vice-President Riak Machar Teny said that he was killed on 19 December in a clash with border guards.

See also
Peter Gadet
Gabriel Tang

References

Small Arms Survey - HSBA Baseline Assessment, Armed Groups: Athor 

1962 births
2011 deaths
Sudan People's Liberation Movement politicians
Deaths by firearm in Sudan
African warlords